is a town located in Aomori Prefecture, Japan. , the town had an estimated population of 25,225  in10789 households, and a population density of 350 persons per km².

Geography
Oirase is located on the eastern coastline of Aomori Prefecture, facing the Pacific Ocean. The land is mostly flat or slightly hilly. The Oirase River, which is the origin of the town's name, flows from east to west, with Lake Towada as its source.

Neighbouring municipalities
Aomori Prefecture
Misawa
Hachinohe
Rokunohe
Gonohe

Climate
The town has a cold maritime climate characterized by cool short summers and long cold winters with heavy snowfall (Köppen climate classification Cfa).  The average annual temperature in Oirase is 10.2 °C. The average annual rainfall is 1158 mm with September as the wettest month. The temperatures are highest on average in August, at around 22.8 °C, and lowest in January, at around -1.6 °C.

Demographics
Per Japanese census data, the population of Oirase has steadily increased over the past 40 years.

History
During the Edo period, the area around Oirase was controlled by the Nambu clan of Morioka Domain, becoming part of the territories of Shichinohe Domain in the latter half of the Edo period. In the post-Meiji Restoration establishment of the modern municipalities system on 1 April 1889, the villages of Momoishi and Shimoda were created. Monoishi was elevated to town status on April 20, 1929 and Shimoda on August 1, 1969. The town of Oirase was established by the merger of the former towns of Momoishi and Shimoda, on March 1, 2006. The town was named after the Oirase River.

Government
Oirase has a mayor-council form of government with a directly elected mayor and a unicameral town council of 16 members. Oirase is part of Kamikita District which contributes four members to the Aomori Prefectural Assembly. In terms of national politics, the town is part of Aomori 2nd district of the lower house of the Diet of Japan.

Economy
The economy of Oirase is heavily dependent on agriculture, with main crops including rice, strawberries,  Japanese yam and carrots.  The town has become commercially more vibrant with the construction of AEON Group, Jusco Shopping center in 1995 and the spin-off retailing this has attracted. The major local industry is Momokawa Brewing, Inc, a nationally-known sake brewer. Oirase also serves as a bedroom community for the nearby cities of Misawa and Hachinohe.

Education
Oirase has five public elementary schools and three public middle schools operated by the town government. The town has one public high school operated by the Aomori Prefectural Board of Education.

Transportation

Railway
  Aoimori Railway Company - Aoimori Railway Line
 -

Highway
  Momoishi Road
  Second Michinoku Toll Road

Local attractions
Akōbō Kofun Cluster, a Kofun period National Historic Site

Noted people from Oirase
Shingo Mimura, politician

References

External links

Official Website 

 
Towns in Aomori Prefecture
Populated coastal places in Japan